2 Hot! is an album by American vocalist duo Peaches & Herb. The album was issued in 1978. It was the strongest performing album by the duo on the Billboard charts, where it topped the R&B Albums chart and reached the second position on the Pop Albums chart. 2 Hot notably featured the disco hit "Shake Your Groove Thing" and the No. 1 R&B and pop ballad, "Reunited".

Reception

The AllMusic review by Andrew Hamilton awarded the album 3 stars stating "Disco jams and sweet ballads are featured on Peaches & Herb's return to the charts after a long absence... This new Peaches oozed sexuality, and her voice could raise the dead... The duo's specialty were ballads, and "Four's a Traffic Jam" is a beauty, Fame's sweet falsetto and Greene's sexy phrasings are intoxicating."

Track listing

Charts

Weekly charts

Year-end charts

Personnel 

Benjamin Barrett – contractor
Mathieu Bitton – design
David Blumberg – horn arrangements, string arrangements
Bob "Boogie" Bowles – guitar
Samuel F. Brown III - string arrangements, percussion
Philip Chiang – design
Rick Clifford – assistant engineer
Paulinho da Costa – percussion
Mike Doud – art direction, design
Scott Edwards – bass (uncredited)
Electric Ivory Experience (John Barnes and Bob Robitaille) – synthesizer, synthesizer arrangements
Herb Fame – vocals
Larry Farrow – keyboards
James Gadson – drums
Roger Glenn – flute, soloist
Linda "Peaches" Greene – vocals
Michele Horie – art direction, production coordination
Pat Lawrence – executive producer
Gavin Lurssen – mastering
Wade Marcus – horn arrangements, string arrangements
Jim McCrary – photography
Freddie Perren – keyboards, producer, rhythm arrangements, vibraphone
Steve Pouliot – engineer
Peter Manning Robinson – horn arrangements, string arrangements, synthesizer, synthesizer arrangements
Jack Rouben – engineer, remixing
Jessica Ruiz – master tape research
Lily Salinas – master tape research
Thane Tierney – selection
David T. Walker – guitar
Wah Wah Watson – guitar
Harry Weinger – reissue supervisor
Bob Zimmitti – percussion

See also
 List of number-one R&B albums of 1979 (U.S.)

References

1978 albums
Peaches & Herb albums
Albums arranged by Wade Marcus
Albums produced by Freddie Perren
Polydor Records albums